Sir Alfred Jerome Cadman  (17 June 1847 – 23 March 1905) was a New Zealand politician of the Liberal Party. He was the Minister of Railways from 1895 to 1899 in the Liberal Government.

Early life
Cadman was born in Sydney, Australia, in 1847. His family emigrated to Auckland in 1848.

Political career

He was the Member of Parliament for several electorates: Coromandel 1881–1890, Thames 1890–1893 (resigned), City of Auckland 1893, Waikato 1893–1896 and  1896–1899, when he retired from the Lower House. He resigned and was re-elected in the 1893 by-election after a challenge to his personal integrity.

In 1899 he was then appointed to the Legislative Council, of which he was a member from 21 December 1899 until he died, and was Speaker from 7 July 1904 until he died.

He was appointed a Companion of the Order of St Michael and St George (CMG) in June 1901, on the occasion of the visit of TRH the Duke and Duchess of Cornwall and York (later King George V and Queen Mary) to New Zealand.
In 1903 he was knighted and promoted to a Knight Commander within the Order of St Michael and St George (KCMG).

Death
Cadman died in Auckland on 23 March 1905.

References

Further reading

External links 

Cyclopaedia of New Zealand photograph

|-

|-

|-

|-

|-

|-

|-

1847 births
1905 deaths
Australian emigrants to New Zealand
New Zealand Knights Commander of the Order of St Michael and St George
Local politicians in New Zealand
Members of the Cabinet of New Zealand
Speakers of the New Zealand Legislative Council
Members of the New Zealand Legislative Council
New Zealand Liberal Party MPs
Politicians from Sydney
New Zealand Liberal Party MLCs
Members of the New Zealand House of Representatives
New Zealand MPs for North Island electorates
New Zealand MPs for Auckland electorates
19th-century Australian politicians
19th-century New Zealand politicians
New Zealand politicians awarded knighthoods
Justice ministers of New Zealand